Afroclanis is a genus of moths in the family Sphingidae. The genus was erected by Robert Herbert Carcasson in 1968.

Species
Afroclanis calcareus (Rothschild & Jordan 1907)
Afroclanis neavi (Hampson 1910)

References

Smerinthini
Moth genera
Taxa named by Robert Herbert Carcasson